Tapinoma israele is a species of ant in the genus Tapinoma. Described by Forel in 1904, the species is endemic to Algeria and Israel.
Tapinoma israele is one of the fewest species  that build Solaria during the winter.

References

Tapinoma
Hymenoptera of Africa
Hymenoptera of Asia
Insects described in 1904